Prairie Express is a 1947 American Western film directed by Lambert Hillyer and written by Anthony Coldeway and J. Benton Cheney. The film stars Johnny Mack Brown, Raymond Hatton, Virginia Belmont, Marshall Reed, William Ruhl and Robert Winkler. The film was released on October 25, 1947, by Monogram Pictures.

Plot

Cast              
Johnny Mack Brown as Johnny Hudson
Raymond Hatton as Faro Jenkins
Virginia Belmont as Peggy Porter
Marshall Reed as Burke
William Ruhl as Gordon Gregg 
Robert Winkler as Dave Porter
Frank LaRue as Jarrett
Ted Adams as Lem
Steve Darrell as Sheriff Bill
Craig Duncan as Pete 
Gary Garrett as Kent
Hank Worden as Deputy Clint
Bob McElroy as Joe
Carl Mathews as Collins
Boyd Stockman as Perry
Curley Gibson as Ed

References

External links
 

1947 films
American Western (genre) films
1947 Western (genre) films
Monogram Pictures films
Films directed by Lambert Hillyer
American black-and-white films
1940s English-language films
1940s American films